The 2017–18 FIS Ski Jumping World Cup was the 39th World Cup season in ski jumping for men, the 21st official World Cup season in ski flying, and the 7th World Cup season for ladies. The season began on 19 November 2017 in Wisła, Poland, and concluded on 25 March 2018 in Planica, Slovenia.

The highlight of the ladies' season was the first edition of the "Lillehammer Triple", contested between 1–3 December 2017 in Lillehammer, with a total of three individual events: two on the normal hill and one on the large hill. The best athletes of these three competitions received an additional prize money of €10,000 (divided between the Top 3).

On 16 December 2017, the first ever ladies' World Cup team event was held in Hinterzarten.

The first edition of a new competition, the "Willingen Five", took place from 2–4 February 2018 in Willingen. A total of five rounds counted in the final standings: Friday's qualification round, two individual competition rounds from Saturday and two from Sunday. The Willingen Five overall winner was awarded with an extra €25,000.

The first edition of a new competition, the "Planica7", took place from 22–25 March 2018 in Planica. A total of seven rounds counted in the final standings: Thursday's qualification round, two individual competition rounds on Friday, two team competition rounds on Saturday and two individual competition rounds from the season final on Sunday. The Planica 7 overall winner was awarded with an extra 20,000 CHF.

For the first time since the introduction of qualification sessions in the 1990–91 season, the top ten athletes in the World Cup rankings were no longer "pre-qualified", and therefore had to achieve a result good enough for them to qualify for the competition.

Map of world cup hosts 
All 24 locations hosting world cup events for men (18) and ladies (9) in this season.

 Raw Air
 Planica 7
 Willingen Five
 Four Hills Tournament
 Ladies only

Calendar

Men

Ladies

Men's team

Ladies' team

Men's standings

Overall

Nations Cup

Prize money

Four Hills Tournament

Ski Flying

Raw Air

Willingen Five

Planica7

Ladies' standings

Overall

Nations Cup

Prize money

Lillehammer Triple

Yellow bib timeline

Men

Ladies

Raw Air

Planica7

Ski Flying

Four Hills Tournament

Lillehammer Triple

Willingen Five

Qualifications

Men

Ladies

Participants 

Overall, a total of 23 countries for both men and ladies participated in this season:

Achievements 

First World Cup career victory
 Junshirō Kobayashi (26), in his seventh season – the WC 1 in Wisła
 Andreas Stjernen (29), in his ninth season – the WC 12 in Tauplitz/Bad Mitterndorf
 Anže Semenič (24), in his sixth season – the WC 13 in Zakopane
 Robert Johansson (27), in his fifth season – the WC 20 in Vikersund

First World Cup podium 
 Junshirō Kobayashi (26), in his seventh season – the WC 1 in Wisła
 Dawid Kubacki (27), in his eleventh season – the WC 8 in Oberstdorf
 Anže Semenič (24), in his sixth season – the WC 13 in Zakopane
 Nika Križnar (17), in her third season – the WC 12 in Râșnov

Number of wins this season (in brackets are all-time wins)
 Kamil Stoch – 9 (31)
 Maren Lundby – 9 (13)
 Richard Freitag – 3 (8)
 Katharina Althaus – 3 (4)
 Sara Takanashi – 2 (55)
 Daniel-André Tande – 2 (5)
 Daniela Iraschko-Stolz – 1 (13)
 Anders Fannemel – 1 (4)
 Andreas Wellinger – 1 (3)
 Jernej Damjan – 1 (2)
 Johann André Forfang – 1 (2)
 Robert Johansson – 1 (1)
 Junshirō Kobayashi – 1 (1)
 Anže Semenič – 1 (1)
 Andreas Stjernen – 1 (1)

Footnotes

References 

FIS Ski Jumping World Cup
World cup
World cup